Fantezi is a Turkish music genre composed in Turkish language in accordance with the tradition of the Turkish people. Also called folk song or urban folk music, in its plural form is a Turkish music genre which has taken many forms over the years. Fantezi followed after the commercialization of Turkish classical music and Kanto music. It was strong dominated by Turkish folk music. When used in context, it refers mostly to the form it took in the period from the 1920s to the 1980s. It is a vocal works emerged in 20th century, in free style, and usually having several part, each part composed in  different tempo or method.
The main cultural Turkish dances and rhythms of today's Turkish music culture Fantezi music are Tsifteteli, Syrta, Kaşık Havası (Fazzani), Zeybek dance, Hasaposerviko, Kalamatianos (Devr-i Hindî), Karsilamas, Maqsoum, Baladi, Sama'i (Waltz), Ayoub, Malfuf, Saidi, Masmoudi, Fellahi, Karachi, and Khaleegy(Haligi).

Fantezi music was known as "Taverna müziği" performed live in the taverns and was very popular in the 80's.  

Most notable performers:
Ferdi Özbeğen
Selami Şahin
İbrahim Erkal
Nejat Alp
Ümit Besen
Arif Susam
Cengiz Kurtoğlu
Atilla Kaya

See also
Rebetiko
Laïko
Nightclubs in Greece

References

External links

http://www.notaarsivleri.com/arama.html?kelime=fantezi

20th-century music genres
Folk
Middle Eastern culture
Turkish culture
Middle Eastern music
World music genres